Oak–VGH is a planned underground station for the Millennium Line of Metro Vancouver's SkyTrain rapid transit system. It will be located at the southwest corner of the intersection of West Broadway and Laurel Street near Vancouver General Hospital in the Fairview neighbourhood of Vancouver, British Columbia, Canada. Originally scheduled to open in 2025, the station's projected opening was pushed back to early 2026 in November 2022.

During planning, the station was known as Fairview–VGH. On September 17, 2020, the station was renamed to include reference to the nearby Oak Street, only one block west of the station.

Station information

References

External links

Millennium Line stations
Railway stations scheduled to open in 2026
Buildings and structures in Vancouver
Proposed railway stations in Canada